Faisal Naved (born 2 March 1980) is a Pakistani first-class cricketer who played for Sialkot cricket team.

References

External links
 

1980 births
Living people
Pakistani cricketers
Sialkot cricketers
Cricketers from Sialkot
Gujranwala cricketers
Zarai Taraqiati Bank Limited cricketers
Sialkot Stallions cricketers